Johnson Keland Management, Inc. is a Family Office  providing corporate governance, financial and advisory services to the individual members of the Samuel Curtis Johnson, Jr. and Karen Johnson Boyd families. When Samuel Curtis Johnson, Jr. passed on his wealth in 2004 he was the richest man in Wisconsin. The company was formed in 1979 and maintains a professional and administrative staff of 21 people.

References

Companies based in Racine, Wisconsin
Financial services companies established in 1979